Saptasagar  is a village in the southern state On River Bank of Krishna  Karnataka, State India. It is located in the Athani taluk of Belgaum district in Karnataka.

Demographics
 India census, Saptasagar had a population of 5431 with 2794 males and 2637 females.

See also
 Belgaum
 Districts of Karnataka

References

External links
 http://Belgaum.nic.in/

Villages in Belagavi district